Edmondo Sanjust di Teulada (Cagliari, February 21, 1858 – Rome, September 5, 1936) was an Italian engineer and politician. He was appointed senator of the Kingdom of Italy.

Biography

He belonged to an aristocratic Sardinian family of Catalan origins. He was councillor in Cagliari, and in 1904  became life member of the World Association for Waterborne Transport Infrastructure in Bruxelles. In 1909 was appointed member of the executive committee for the Milan International EXPO.

In 1909 developed the regulatory plan of Rome, which established the first expansion of the city outside the Aurelian walls.

Between 1919 and 1920 was undersecretary of state at the Ministry of Maritime and Rail Transport; since September 18, 1924, he was general chairman of the Alto Consiglio dei Lavori Pubblici.

References

Bibliography

Vito Fiorellini, Edmondo Sanjust di Teulada. Legge Zanardelli per la Basilicata, leggi per la Sardegna, piani regolatori, Potenza, Società Tipografica Editrice Sud e Regione Basilicata, 2010. .

People from Cagliari
1858 births
1936 deaths